William Robert Dyke Jr. (August 2, 1906 – April 8, 1984) was an American Negro league second baseman in the 1940s.

A native of Bellevue, Virginia, Dyke played for the Jacksonville Red Caps in 1942. He died in Salem, Virginia in 1984 at age 77.

References

External links
 and Seamheads

1906 births
1984 deaths
Jacksonville Red Caps players
20th-century African-American sportspeople